Obregón F.C.. is Mexican football club that plays in the Segunda División Profesional. The club is based in Ciudad Obregón, Sonora.

See also
Football in Mexico

External links
Official Page

Current roster
As of June 14, 2010

 

Football clubs in Sonora
2010 establishments in Mexico